Liza May Post (born 1965) is a Dutch artist.

Early life and education
Post was born in 1965 in the Netherlands. From 1988 to 1993 she studied at the Gerrit Rietveld Academie in Amsterdam. From 1994 to 1995 she did postgraduate studies at Rijksacademie, Amsterdam.

Art career
Post represented the Netherlands in the 49th Venice Biennale in 2001.

Her work is included in the collections of the Walker Art Center, The Hague University of Applied Sciences, the Harn Museum of Art, and the Tate Museum.

References

20th-century Dutch women artists
21st-century Dutch women artists
1965 births
Living people
Gerrit Rietveld Academie alumni